
Gmina Gnojno is a rural gmina (administrative district) in Busko County, Świętokrzyskie Voivodeship, in south-central Poland.

Villages
Gmina Gnojno contains the villages and settlements of Balice, Bugaj, Falki, Glinka, Gnojno, Gorzakiew, Grabki Małe, Janowice Poduszowskie, Janowice Raczyckie, Januszowice, Jarząbki, Kostera, Maciejowice, Płośnia, Poręba, Pożogi, Raczyce, Ruda, Rzeszutki, Skadla, Wola Bokrzycka, Wola Zofiowska, Wólka Bosowska, Zagrody, Zawada and Zofiówka.

Neighbouring gminas
Gmina Gnojno is bordered by the gminas of Busko-Zdrój, Chmielnik, Pierzchnica, Stopnica, Szydłów and Tuczępy.

References
Polish official population figures 2006

Gnojno
Busko County